Stephania suberosa is a shrub native to Thailand, described by Lewis Leonard Forman in 1980.

References

Flora of Asia
suberosa
Plants described in 1980